Purple Hibiscus is a novel written by the Nigerian author Chimamanda Ngozi Adichie. Her debut novel, it was first published by Algonquin Books in 2003.

Synopsis
Purple Hibiscus is set in postcolonial Nigeria, a country beset by political instability and economic difficulties. The central character is Kambili Achike, aged fifteen for much of the period covered by the book, a member of a wealthy family in Enugu State, dominated by her devoutly Catholic father, Eugene. Eugene is both a religious zealot and a violent figure in the Achike household, subjecting his wife Beatrice, Kambili herself, and her brother Jaja to beatings and psychological cruelty. Beatrice even has two miscarriages because of the violence. 

The story is told through Kambili's eyes and is essentially about the disintegration of her family unit and her struggle to grow to maturity. A key period is the time Kambili and her brother spend at the house of her father's sister, Ifeoma, and her three children. This household offers a marked contrast to what Kambili and Jaja are used to. It practices a completely different form of Catholicism, making for a happy, liberal place that encourages its members to be inquisitive, form their own opinions and speak their minds. In this nurturing environment, both Kambili and Jaja become more open and more able to form and voice their own opinions. While at Aunty Ifeoma's, Kambili also falls in love with a young priest, Father Amadi, which awakens her sense of her own sexuality.

Ultimately, a critical mass is reached in terms of the lives of Kambili, Jaja and the existence of their family as it once was. Unable to cope with Eugene's continual violence any longer, Beatrice poisons him. Jaja takes the blame for the crime and ends up in prison. In the meantime, Aunty Ifeoma and her family move to America after she is unfairly dismissed from her job as lecturer at the University of Nigeria, Nsukka.

The novel ends almost three years after these events, on a cautiously optimistic note. Kambili has become a young woman of eighteen, more confident than before, while her brother Jaja is about to be released from prison, hardened but not broken by his experience there. Their mother, Beatrice, has deteriorated psychologically to a great degree.

Major characters

 Kambili Achike is the central character in Purple Hibiscus and also the narrator of the story. Kambili is shy and inhibited because of the years of abuse from her father. That changes when she spends an extended amount of time away from her family home at the house of Aunty Ifeoma and her family. Kambili is the younger of Eugene and Beatrice Achike's two children. She does not like the living environment under her father after she gets used to the freedom of Nsukka. She is a very timid girl at the beginning of the novel, but after staying with her Aunty Ifeoma in Nsukka, she builds up her courage and opens up towards other people.
 Chukwuka Achike, nicknamed "Jaja" by his family, is an intelligent young man about two years his sister's senior. For most of the novel, in the same way as the rest of his family, he is dominated by his father, although ultimately he displays more overt defiance than them, especially by not going to communion on Palm Sunday and causing a massive family scene as a consequence. He takes the blame for his mother's crime and spends almost three years in prison before obtaining an amnesty. Through this time, his personality has hardened but not been broken.
 Eugene Achike is Kambili's father, whom she calls "Papa". He is a wealthy and ostentatious businessman who is also a very strict Catholic who dominates his family for much of the novel by imposing a harsh religious regime in the family home. For much of the novel he controls almost every aspect of his family's life, including imposing a schedule upon the lives of Kambili and her brother Jaja so that every minute of the day is mapped out for them. While on the one hand Eugene is an important man in his society and donates considerable amounts of money to needy individuals and worthy causes, he is prone to outbreaks of violence within the family house, subjecting his wife Beatrice and the two children to severe physical punishment.
 Beatrice Achike, mother and wife in the Achike family, often called "Mama", is a quiet, maternal figure for much of the novel, presenting a softer, more passive presence in the home in contrast to the often tyrannical presence of Eugene. During the course of the novel, Beatrice suffers two miscarriages after severe beatings from Eugene. She polishes the figurines on the  after every beating. It is insinuated that she stays with Eugene partially out of gratitude for his unwillingness to marry another woman after she could only have two children. Ultimately, however, Beatrice cannot cope with Eugene's behaviour and poisons him. Her son, Jaja, takes the blame for the crime and she continues to deteriorate mentally after this point. At the conclusion of the novel, however, with Jaja's impending release from prison, there are some indications that her condition will improve.
 Aunty Ifeoma is Eugene's only sibling, a tall, striking, intelligent woman who works as a lecturer at the University of Nigeria, Nsukka. She is highly capable in many aspects of her life, displaying determination and resourcefulness in bringing up her children without a husband. Though financially struggling, she creates a much happier environment for her children than does her brother Eugene for his family. She was married to another professor, Ifediora, until his unfortunate death. She also is a proud supporter of the Nigerian Pro-Democracy movement, which gets her into trouble at her vocation.
 Amaka is Ifeoma and Ifediora's only daughter. She is Kambili's age, around fifteen, and originally does not like Kambili, believing her to be a snob and jealous of her lavish lifestyle. After a few weeks of getting to know each other, and after Kambili's most severe beating, Amaka begins to better understand Kambili's condition and they become close friends.
 Obiora is the second child and the oldest son of Ifeoma and Ifediora, at around age fourteen. He wears glasses, and is very good at math. He is reserved, yet often speaks up when he feels someone is wrong, as is seen when he contradicts Chiaku. Obiora is also portrayed as the lead male figure in his mother's household.
 Chima is the youngest of Ifeoma and Ifediora's three children. Not much is known about this character, apart from the fact that he looks up to Obiora.
 Father Amadi is a young priest in the circle of Aunty Ifeoma and her family. Being youthful, indigenous and well-versed in contemporary life, he could be described as a "new generation" priest, as opposed to white European priests in the country such as Eugene's priest, Father Benedict. When Kambili falls in love with Father Amadi, he shows considerable thoughtfulness and honor in the sensitive way he makes it clear to her that, because he is devoted to the church, he will never be able to become her partner. He loves her, yet he dare not start a relationship with her because of his profession. He becomes socially and spiritually attached with some of the boys that he taught football. He is shown to be a little playful as he challenged Kambili to a sprint, which leads to his telling her that she had good legs for running. He also takes her to plait her hair, leading the hair dresser to tell Kambili that no man takes a young lady to plait her hair unless he likes her.
 Papa-Nnukwu is both father and grandfather in the Achike family, being Eugene and Ifeoma's father. He is a kind, loving man rooted in the traditional non-Christian beliefs of his indigenous culture, presenting a marked contrast, in particular, to his son Eugene's adherence to European religion and lifestyle.
 Ade Coker is the lead editor of Papa's newspaper, The Standard. He is also the author of rebellious works, which ultimately leads to his death. He speaks out commonly against the current Nigerian government. He is killed by a package bomb in his house.
 Kevin is Papa Eugene's personal driver in Enugu. He was once a part of the military. Beatrice fires him after Papa's death.

Other minor characters in the book include Aunty Chioma, Celestine, Chidifu and Sisi.

Themes 

 Change: The novel is set in a turbulent time in Nigeria's political history, where there is a vacuum of power and a dictator whose rise to power is present in references to oil shortages.
 Religion: Again a call back to colonial times, the theme of religion is present in the interactions between characters. Kambili's father rejects her Grandfather because of his animist beliefs. This is also present in Kambili's thoughts as she is always worried not to commit a sin and scared to anger her father.
Domestic violence: The novel uses a narrative point of view to explore the theme of domestic violence.
 Family relationships: Family relationships are explored in this book such as the relationship between a parent and a child.
 Silence and Speech: The themes of silence and speech appear in the novel. The titles of two of the novel's sections deal with this theme as well: "Speaking with our Spirits" and "A Different Silence".
 Nature: The novel's title is a representation of freedom and hope. There are references to nature throughout the book.
Freedom and Tyranny: The theme of freedom vs tyranny appears in the novel, in the characters as well as the fight for freedom of expression.

Honors
 Hurston-Wright Legacy Award 2004 (Best Debut Fiction Category)
 Commonwealth Writers' Prize 2005: Best First Book (Africa)
 Commonwealth Writers' Prize 2005: Best First Book (overall)
 Shortlisted for the Orange Prize for Fiction 2004
 Longlisted for the Booker Prize 2004
 Nominated for the YALSA (Young Adult Library Services Association) Best Books for Young Adults Award (2004)
 Shortlisted for the John Llewellyn Rhys Prize 2004/2005

Bibliography

References

External links
Purple Hibiscus at H-Net Reviews
Purple Hibiscus webcomic at Webtoons

2003 Nigerian novels
Igboland in fiction
Nigerian English-language novels
Novels by Chimamanda Ngozi Adichie
Novels set in Nigeria
Postcolonial novels
2003 debut novels
Catholic novels
Enugu State
Algonquin Books books